Alexander Moroz (18 January 1961, Dnipropetrovsk – 17 January 2009) was a Ukrainian chess Grandmaster (1999). He was vice-president of the Ukrainian chess federation, president of the chess federation of the Dnipropetrovsk Oblast and chairman of the youth committee of the Ukrainian chess federation as well as International Arbiter.

His best single performance was at Momotov mem Yenakiieve, 1997, where he scored 8.5 of 13 points. Other successful results include equal 1st with Ashot Nadanian at Częstochowa Open 1992, 2nd behind Sergei Movsesian at Pardubice 1995, 1st at Marhanets 1999, and 3rd at Alushta Summer 2006.

Notable games
Alexander Moroz vs Evgeny Vladimirov, URS-ch otbor56 1988, Spanish Game: Bird Variation (C61), 1-0
Vitaly Tseshkovsky vs Alexander Moroz, URS-chT 1990, Spanish Game: Morphy Defense. Chigorin Defense (C99), 0-1
Ratmir Kholmov vs Alexander Moroz, Decin op-A 1998, Sicilian Defense: Old Sicilian (B22), 0-1
Alexander Moroz vs Athanasios Mastrovasilis, Antalya TUR 2001, Spanish Game: Exchange. Keres Variation (C68), 1-0

References

External links

Alexander Moroz at 365Chess.com

1961 births
2009 deaths
Sportspeople from Dnipro
Ukrainian chess players
Chess grandmasters
Chess officials
Chess arbiters
20th-century chess players